Shanghuo, also known as Reqi or Heatiness is a concept related to Traditional Chinese Medicine that involves an imbalance in internal energy that causes negative health effects on the body. It is a widely held belief among Chinese people, although it is not widely accepted by modern science.

Description 
In traditional Chinese beliefs, there are five elements: earth, wood, water, metal and fire. When Yin and Yang are out of balance in a person, this causes fire to be elevated in the person's body producing effects such as fever, sore throat, preference for cold drinks and/or other effects.

Causes 
The consumption of certain foods are commonly thought to cause shanghuo in people. Some examples of the foods linked to shanghuo are raw pineapples, pomegranates, spicy food, and beef liver.

Treatment  
In order to treat the condition of shanghuo, different foods are commonly recommended to be consumed that are "cold". By this is not necessarily meant foods that are physically cold (as in temperature), but rather foods that put out the internal "fire" related to the shanghuo condition. Among such foods include bitter gourd, watermelon, cucumber, eggplant, strawberries, and many others.

Certain less common foods are also use to treat shanghuo. For example, turtle jelly, traditionally made from turtle shells, is also believed to be a good food to consume to deal with shanghuo.

In southeastern China, it is traditional to drink Chinese herbal tea to treat shanghuo.

References 

Traditional Chinese medicine